Edward Sayres (born 19 December 1815 at North Stoke, Sussex; died 11 January 1888 at Cold Ashton, Gloucestershire) was an English amateur cricketer who played first-class cricket from 1838 to 1842.

Edward Sayres was educated at Trinity College, Cambridge. A right-handed batsman and right arm slow roundarm bowler who was mainly associated with Cambridge University, Marylebone Cricket Club (MCC) and Sussex, he made 24 known appearances in first-class matches and took 100 wickets.  He played for the Gentlemen in the Gentlemen v Players series.

In later life he was a clergyman. He was ordained in Norwich in 1845, and served as rector at Cold Ashton from 1850 until his death in 1888. He and his wife Anna married in 1847 and had four sons and three daughters.

References

External links
 
 CricketArchive profile

Further reading
 H S Altham, A History of Cricket, Volume 1 (to 1914), George Allen & Unwin, 1962
 Arthur Haygarth, Scores & Biographies, Volumes 1–11 (1744–1870), Lillywhite, 1862–72

1815 births
1888 deaths
English cricketers
English cricketers of 1826 to 1863
Cambridge University cricketers
Gentlemen cricketers
Marylebone Cricket Club cricketers
Sussex cricketers
Alumni of Trinity College, Cambridge
Cambridge Town Club cricketers
Oxford and Cambridge Universities cricketers
19th-century English Anglican priests
Gentlemen of Sussex cricketers